Yanam, or Ninam, is a Yanomaman language spoken in Roraima, Brazil (800 speakers) and southern Venezuela near the Mucajai, upper Uraricaá, and Paragua rivers.

Synonymy

Yanam is also known by the following names: Ninam, Yanam–Ninam, Xirianá, Shiriana Casapare, Kasrapai, Jawaperi, Crichana, Jawari, Shiriana, Eastern Yanomaman.

Regional variation

Gordon (2009) reports 2 main varieties (Northern, Southern). Kaufman (1994) reports 3:

 Yanam ( Northern Yanam/Ninam (Xiliana, Shiriana, Uraricaa-Paragua))
 Ninam (a.k.a. Southern Yanam/Ninam (Xilixana, Shirishana, Mukajai))
 Jawarib

The name Jawari is shared with Yaroamë.

There are three dialects spoken in Roraima, Brazil according to Ferreira, et al. (2019):

 Northern (Xiriana): Ericó and Saúba
 Southern: Mucajaí
 Central: Uraricoera

The remaining speakers of Arutani and Sapé also speak Ninam (Shirián), since they now mostly live in Ninam villages.

Phonology 
Yanam has seven base vowels. Yanam has both vowel length and nasalization, and both features can occur simultaneously, for all vowels except for /ɨ/.

References

 Campbell, Lyle. (1997). American Indian languages: The historical linguistics of Native America. New York: Oxford University Press. .
 Kaufman, Terrence. (1994). The native languages of South America. In C. Mosley & R. E. Asher (Eds.), Atlas of the world's languages (pp. 46–76). London: Routledge.
 Migliazza, Ernest; & Grimes, J. E. (1961). Shiriana phonology. Anthropological Linguistics. (June).

External links
Ninam (Shirishana variety) (Intercontinental Dictionary Series)

Yanomaman languages
Languages of Brazil
Languages of Venezuela
Subject–object–verb languages